Shlomi Dora (born June 22, 1973, in Haifa) is an Israeli football manager.

His younger brother is the footballer Yossi Dora who was play for Hapoel Haifa.

Honours

As manager
Liga Leumit (1):
2008–09

External links
Profile at IFA

Israeli Jews
1974 births
Living people
Israeli football managers
Hapoel Haifa F.C. managers
Hapoel Ramat Gan F.C. managers
Bnei Sakhnin F.C. managers
Hapoel Acre F.C. managers
Maccabi Netanya F.C. managers
Hapoel Ironi Kiryat Shmona F.C. managers
F.C. Kafr Qasim managers
Sektzia Ness Ziona F.C. managers
Sportspeople from Haifa
Israeli people of Egyptian-Jewish descent